Shut Out may refer to:
 Shutout, a game in which one team prevents the opposing team from scoring
 Shut Out (album), a 1977 album by Paul Jabara
 "Shut Out" (song), a 1977 song by Paul Jabara and Donna Summer
 "Shutout", a song by The Walker Brothers from their 1978 album Nite Flights
 Shut Out (horse), a thoroughbred racehorse